The 1970 All-Ireland Senior Football Championship Final was the 83rd All-Ireland Final and the deciding match of the 1970 All-Ireland Senior Football Championship, an inter-county Gaelic football tournament for the top teams in Ireland. 

Kerry won convincingly with late goals by Din Joe Crowley and Mick Gleeson.

It was the first of four All-Ireland football titles won by Kerry in the 1970s.

References

All-Ireland Senior Football Championship Final
All-Ireland Senior Football Championship Final, 1970
All-Ireland Senior Football Championship Finals
All-Ireland Senior Football Championship Finals
Kerry county football team matches
Meath county football team matches